Deist Requiem is an industrial rock band from Virginia Beach, Virginia, founded by frontman Kyzer Kooper (born William Alan Cooper in 1973 in Kingsport, Tennessee). The band was signed to Warhead Records America for its self-titled CD which was produced by Martin Atkins (Pigface, Ministry, Nine Inch Nails). After dropping the label as a result of disputes over rights and money , the band then went out on their own label, Sacrifice Records.

The band toured across the United States for several years, gaining a large underground following, while opening for bands such as Alice Cooper, Scorpions, Gwar, Marilyn Manson, Morbid Angel, Kid Rock, Sevendust, Sister machine Gunn, La Guns, Hate Dept, King's X (Poundhound with Dug Pinnick), Boiler, Dog Fashion Disco, Overkill, Nile, Staind, The Dave Brockie Experience, Bongzilla, Bad Religion, Wednesday 13, Lamb of God and many more. DEIST REQUIEM was signed and endorsed by Jägermeister in 1998 and was one of the first in the Jäger band promotion. After disbanding in 2002, Kyzer Kooper and the co-founding guitar player David Wright joined with keyboardist Toad and bassist Jeff Daye to form DEVIL JOY, they released one CD called The Fine Art of Failure in 2006.

In 2009, Kyzer Kooper formed the band America's Most Rotten. The band went on a small number of tours, recorded a CD, and promptly disbanded. However, the CD was never released. In 2010, Kooper reformed DEIST with Red Burke (bass), Lucky Riggs (guitar) and Scott Stewart (drums) for a series of concerts.

In 2011, former drummer Jodi Joy joined Universal Records recording artist Hear Kitty Kitty, as of 2012 Joy was no longer with the band.

Former bass player Brian Powers is now a member of the country group Phoenix Drive.

Former guitar player Brance Arnold is one half of the country duo Chacho and Brance. They are regulars on the nationally syndicated show Troubadour TX.

The 2013 horror film Music Store Massacre starring David Meadows and Gordon Price featured 4 songs by the band. Lead singer Kyzer Kooper also made his film debut under his real name William Cooper.

Deist Requiem returned to the stage October 19, 2013 at Zakk's in Murfreesboro, North Carolina. This was then followed by Halloween Night at Jewish Mother in Virginia Beach, VA on October 31, 2013.

Work on CD recorded at GWAR's Slave Pit Studio is complete and will be released March 3, 2015 via Sacrifice Records. The CD will be titled "The Happiness Delusion". This is the last recordings to feature what some consider the 'classic' line up. The CD was Produced, Mixed and Mastered by h3, singer of hERETICS iN tHE lAB.

March 21, 2015 at The Riff House in Chesapeake, Va Mark Flyge (Former Bane, 8 Fraud guitarist) performed his first show with Deist Requiem. He has officially joined Deist Requiem as a second guitarist. This is the first time the band has carried a 2 guitar player lineup on a permanent basis.

The song 'Sugar Daddy Serenade' from the CD 'The Happiness Delusion' will be featured in the upcoming 2016 horror film 'The Devil's Door'.

Band line-up
Kyzer Kooper Vocals/Keyboards/Programming (1991–present)

Mark Flyge Guitar / Bass (2015–2019)

Mike Gotte Drums (2012–2019)

Lucky Riggs Guitar (2010 - 2015 / 2017–2019)

Former members
Brad Way Keyboards/Programming (1991-1993)

David Isley Vocals/Programming (1991-1993)

David Wright Guitar (1993-1996 / 2002-2003)

Bryan Wray Drums (1993-1995)

Brian Powers Bass (1995-2002)

Jodi Joy Drums (1995-2002)

Mike Adams Guitar (1994-1995)

Lucas Marino Guitar (1997-1998)

Juan Marerro Guitar (1998-2000)

Brance Arnold Guitar (2000-2002)

Jeff Daye Bass (2002-2003)

Allen King Drums (2002-2003)

Scott Stewart Drums (2010-2012)

Red Burke Bass (2010 - 2015)

Discography
Deitiphobia (Tape Release only) 1992

Side One:
 Bright Darkness Of The Soul
 Death My Wonderful Home
 No More Sunshine
 Trapped Under Ice
 Crucified Before Fools

Side Two:
 Dark Child
 Colourless Insanity
 Fools 2 Follow
 The Crow
 My Trip

Deist Requiem War Head Records 1996

 Jesus Lives in Waco
 Fucked-Up Way to Die
 Harder
 Parasite System
 Happy
 The In between
 Wanna Be God
 The Closet
 Nothing Left To Give
 Requiem For A Generation

Hate Songs From The Heart Sacrifice Records 1998

 Luggagebabby
 Letter2Luc
 Spooky Mama Eats Electric
 Prozac
 Circumcision
 I Want To Fuck You Underneath The Milky Way
 No U/Invitation
 PCP (Psycho Cunt Phobia)
 Dope Fiend Smile
 Faces Of The Men
 Massive Mind Fuck
 Sacrifice Of The Day

A Tribute To Ministry 1999 on Invisible Records Another Prick In The Wall

 Land Of Rape And Honey—Electric Hellfire Club
 Jesus Built My Hotrod—Shining
 Work for Love—En Esch
 Just One Fix—Meg Lee Chin
 So What—Terminal 46
 Thieves—Resident Phase Shifter
 The Cannibal Song—Attrition
 She's Got a Cause—The Aliens
 Revenge—Dessau
 Deity—Deist Requiem
 You Know What You Are—Sons of Midnight
 Just One Fix—Heavy Water Factory

Trendy Sacrifice Records 2000

 Trendy
 15 Minutes
 What Will Make Us Do It?
 Harder (live)
 Fucked Up Way to Die (live)
 Sacrifice of the Day (live)
 Prozac (live)
 Deity

Deist : Requiem for a generation 1992–2002 Sacrifice Records 2002(OUT OF PRINT)

Deist Side

Disc 1
 Scapegoat
 Misplaced
 Sorry You Love Me
 Spooky Mama Eats Electric (Remix)
 Letter2Luc (Remix)
 Luggage Baby (Remix)
 Sacrifice Of The Day
 PCP
 Prozac
 No U/Invitation
 I Want To Fuck You Underneath The Milky Way
 Circumcision
 Faces Of The Men
 Dope Fiend Smile
 Massive Mind Fuck
 Trendy
 15 Minutes
 What Will Make Us Do It Requiem Side

Requiem Side
Disc 2
 Fucked-Up Way 2 Die
 Harder
 Wanna Be God
 Parasite System
 The Closet
 Happy
 Jesus Lives In Waco
 Nothing Left 2 Give
 The In between
 Requiem For A Generation
 Deity
 Devil In My Closet (demo)
 Happy (demo)

Absence of Faith: The Best of Deist Requiem Sacrifice Records 2010

 Fucked Up Way 2 Die
 Trendy
 Harder
 Parasite System
 15 minutes
 Wanna Be God
 Spooky Mama Eats Electric (Greco Remix)
 What Will Make Us Do It?
 Luggage Baby (Greco Remix)
 The In between
 Letter2Luc (Greco remix)
 Scapegoat (Demo)
 Misplaced (Demo)
 Sorry You Love Me (Demo)
 Deity
 Prozac

The Happiness Delusion Sacrifice Records (Released March 3, 2015)

 Scapegoat
 Motherfucker Talked Through The Whole Damn Movie
 Misplaced
 Sorry You Love Me
 God On A Good Day (Featuring Roddy Lane)
 This Grey Day
 G.D.H.B.
 Fiend
 Sugar Daddy Serenade
 Nobody

External links
Record label web sites
 Warhead Records
 Invisible Records
 Sacrifice Records
 Hear Kitty Kitty
 Phoenix Drive
 Chacho and Brance
 757zine Interview 2014 
 The Happiness Delusion CD 
 The Daily Press 'Deist Requiem's new album'

References

Rock music groups from Virginia
American industrial rock musical groups